Lyonia ovalifolia is a species of plant in the family Ericaceae. This plant is Native to Himalaya, Nepal, China, Japan, Cambodia, Myanmar, Thailand, Vietnam and Malaysia. It is known as Anyaar in India and Angeri in Nepal.

References

Flora of Nepal
ovalifolia
Flora of China
Flora of Japan
Flora of Cambodia
Plants described in 1897